Professional Air Traffic Controllers Organization (PATCO/AFSCME) is a United States labor union which represents air traffic controllers at a number of locations.

PATCO/AFSCME is a division of the Federation of Physicians & Dentists–Alliance of Healthcare and Professional Employees, an affiliate of the American Federation of State, County and Municipal Employees (AFSCME).

External links
 

Air traffic controllers' trade unions
American Federation of State, County and Municipal Employees